Thomas Somerville Tait (13 September 1879 – 2 October 1942) was a Scottish footballer, who played for Sunderland and the Scotland national football team as a right half.

Club career
Raised in Lanarkshire, Tait began his career locally with Airdrieonians, then moved to England to join Bristol Rovers in 1903. He transferred to Sunderland three years later and made his debut for the club on 1 September 1906 against Newcastle United in a 4–2 win at St. James' Park. Tait played for Sunderland from 1906 to 1912, though he didn't win a trophy; he made 181 league appearances and scored 3 goals while at Roker Park. His later clubs included Dundee.

International career
Having taken part in the Home Scots v Anglo-Scots trial match in 1909, Tait made his only appearance for Scotland against Wales in a 2–2 draw on 6 March 1911 at Ninian Park.

See also
 List of Scotland international footballers with one cap

References
Tommy Tait's careers stats at The Stat Cat

1879 births
People from Carluke
People from Cleland, North Lanarkshire
Association football wing halves
English Football League players
Southern Football League players
Scottish Football League players
Scottish footballers
Scotland international footballers
Airdrieonians F.C. (1878) players
Bristol Rovers F.C. players
Cambuslang Rangers F.C. players
Sunderland A.F.C. players
Dundee F.C. players
Armadale F.C. players
Footballers from South Lanarkshire
1942 deaths
Footballers from North Lanarkshire